Segovia is a town and municipality in Antioquia Department, Colombia. Part of the subregion of Northeastern Antioquia. There are gold mines in the area.

References 

Municipalities of Antioquia Department